The chronology of the Bible is an elaborate system of lifespans, 'generations', and other means by which the Masoretic Hebrew Bible (the text of the Bible most commonly in use today) measures the passage of events from the creation to around 164 BCE (the year of the re-dedication of the Second Temple). It was theological in intent, not historical in the modern sense, and functions as an implied prophecy whose key lies in the identification of the final event. The passage of time is measured initially by adding the ages of the Patriarchs at the birth of their firstborn sons, later through express statements, and later still by the synchronised reigns of the kings of Israel and Judah. 

The chronology is highly schematic, marking out a world cycle of 4,000 years. The Exodus takes place in the year Anno Mundi 2666, exactly two thirds of the way through the four thousand years; the construction of Solomon's Temple is commenced 480 years, or 12 generations of 40 years each, after that; and 430 years pass between the building of Solomon's Temple and its destruction during the siege of Jerusalem. The 50 years between the destruction of the Temple and the "Decree of Cyrus" and end of the Babylonian Exile, added to the 430 years for which the Temple stood, produces another symmetrical period of 480 years. The 374 years between the Edict of Cyrus and the re-dedication of the Second Temple by the Maccabees complete the 4,000 year cycle.

As recently as the 17th–18th century, the Archbishop of Armagh James Ussher (term 1625–1656), and scholars of the stature of Isaac Newton (1642–1727) believed that dating creation was knowable from the Bible. Today, the Genesis creation narrative has long since vanished from serious cosmology, the Patriarchs and the Exodus are no longer included in most serious histories of ancient Israel, and it is almost universally accepted that the Book of Joshua and the Book of Judges have little historical value. Even the United Monarchy is questioned, and although scholars continue to advance proposals for reconciling the chronology of the Books of Kings, there is "little consensus on acceptable methods of dealing with conflicting data."

Pre-Masoretic chronologies 
During the centuries that Hebrew Bible canon developed, theological chronologies emerged at different composition stages, although scholars have advanced various theories to identify these stages and their schematizations of time. These chronologies include:
 A "Progenitor" chronology that placed Abraham's birth at Anno Mundi (AM) 1600 and the foundation of the Temple at AM 2800. Alfred Jepsen proposed this chronology on the basis of melding time periods in the Samaritan and Masoretic recensions.
 Distinct chronologies can be inferred from the Priestly source (of the Torah), along with priestly authors of later biblical books, and the Deuteronomistic history, which purports to chronicle the reigns of the kings of Judah and Israel (with some significant historical corroboration, see below and History of ancient Israel and Judah). 
 The Nehemiah chronology, devised to show 3,500 years from creation to Nehemiah's mission. Northcote says that this chronology was "probably composed by Levites in Jerusalem not long after Nehemiah's mission, perhaps sometime late in the fifth century BCE (i.e. nearing 400 BCE)." Bousset (1900) apparently sees this schematization, too, but calls it Proto-MT.
 A proto-Masoretic chronology, shaped by jubilees, with an overall literary showing of 3,480 years from creation to the completion of the Second Temple, per B.W. Bousset (1900), and which had the first Temple at 3,000 years.
 The Saros chronology that reflected 3,600 years leading up to the first Temple and 4,080 years from creation to the completion of the Second Temple. This scheme served as "the basis for the later Septuagint chronology and pre-SP Samaritan Pentateuch chronologies".

Masoretic Text 
The Masoretic Text is the basis of modern Jewish and Christian bibles. While difficulties with biblical texts make it impossible to reach sure conclusions, perhaps the most widely held hypothesis is that it embodies an overall scheme of 4,000 years (a "great year") taking the re-dedication of the Temple by the Maccabees in 164 BCE as its end-point. Two motives may have led to this: first, there was a common idea at the time of the Maccabees that human history followed the plan of a divine "week" of seven "days" each lasting a thousand years; and second, a 4,000 year history (even longer in the Septuagint version) would establish the antiquity of the Jews against their pagan neighbours. The following table summarises the Masoretic chronology from the creation of the world in Anno Mundi (Year of the World) 1 to its endpoint in AM 4000:

Other chronologies: Septuagint, Samaritan, Jubilees, Seder Olam

The canonical text of the Hebrew Bible is called the Masoretic Text, a text preserved by Jewish rabbis from early in the 7th and 10th centuries CE. There are, however, two other major texts, the Septuagint and the Samaritan Pentateuch. The Septuagint is a Koine Greek translation of the original Biblical Hebrew holy books. It is estimated that the first five books of the Septuagint, known as the Torah or Pentateuch, were translated in the mid-3rd century BCE and the remaining texts were translated in the 2nd century BCE. It mostly agrees with the Masoretic Text, but not in its chronology. 

The Samaritan text is preserved by the Samaritan community. This community dates from some time in the last few centuries BCE—just when is disputed—and, like the Septuagint, their Bible differs markedly from the Masoretic Text in its chronology. Modern scholars do not regard the Masoretic Text as superior to the other two—the Masoretic is sometimes clearly wrong, as when it says that Saul began to reign at one year of age and reigned for two years. More relevantly, all three texts have a clear purpose, which is not to record history so much as to bring the narrative to a point which represents the culmination of history. In the Samaritan Pentateuch, the genealogies and narratives were shaped to ensure a chronology of 3000 years from creation to the Israelite settlement of Canaan. Northcote reports this as the "Proto-SP chronology," as designated by John Skinner (1910), and he speculates that this chronology may have been extended to put the rebuilding of the Second Temple at an even AM 3900, after three 1,300-year phases. In the Septuagint version of the Pentateuch the Israelite chronology extends 4,777 years from creation to the finishing of the Second Temple, as witnessed in the Codex Alexandrinus manuscript. This calculation only emerges by supplementing Septuagint with the MT's chronology of kings. There were at least 3 variations of Septuagint chronology; Eusebius used one variation, now favored by Hughes and others. Northcote asserts that the Septuagint calendrical pattern was meant to demonstrate that there were 5,000 years from creation to a contemporaneous Ptolemaic Egypt, .

The 2nd century BCE Book of Jubilees begins with the Creation and measures time in years, "weeks" of years (groups of seven years), and jubilees (sevens of sevens), so that the interval from Creation to the settlement of Canaan, for example, is exactly fifty jubilees (2450 years).

Dating from the 2nd century CE, and still in common use among Jews, was the Seder Olam Rabbah ("Great Order of the World"), a work tracing the history of the world and the Jews from Creation to the 2nd century CE. It allows 410 years for the duration of the First Temple, 70 years from its destruction to the Second Temple, and 420 years for the duration of the Second Temple, making a total of 900 years for the two temples. This schematic approach to numbers accounts for its most remarkable feature, the fact that it shortens the entire Persian Empire from over two centuries to just 52 years, mirroring the 52 years it gives to the Babylonian exile.

Christian use and development of biblical chronology
The early church father Eusebius, attempting to place Christ in the chronology, put his birth in AM 5199, and this became the accepted date for the Western Church. As the year AM 6000 (800 CE) approached there was increasing fear that the end of the world was nigh, until the Venerable Bede made his own calculations and found that Christ's birth took place in AM 3592, allowing several more centuries to the end of time.

Martin Luther (1483–1546) switched the point of focus from Christ's birth to the Apostolic Council of Acts 15, which he placed in the year AM 4000, believing this marked the moment when the Mosaic Law was abolished and the new age of grace began. This was widely accepted among European Protestants, but in the English-speaking world, Archbishop James Ussher (1581–1656) calculated a date of 4004 BCE for creation; he was not the first to reach this result, but his chronology was so detailed that his dates were incorporated into the margins of English Bibles for the next two hundred years. This popular 4,000 year theological timespan, which ends with the birth of Jesus, differs from the 4,000 timespan later proposed for the Masoretic text alone, which ends with the Temple rededication in 164 BCE.

The Israelite kings

The chronology of the monarchy, unlike that of earlier periods, can be checked against non-biblical sources and seems to be correct in general terms. This raises the prospect that the Books of Kings, linking the Hebrew kings by accession and length of reign ("king X of Judah came to the throne in the nth year of king Y of Israel and ruled n years"), can be used to reconstruct a chronology for the monarchy, but the task has in fact proven intractably difficult. The problem is that the books contain numerous contradictions: to take just one example, since Rehoboam of Judah and Jeroboam of Israel began to rule at the same time (1 Kings 12), and since Ahaziah of Judah and Joram of Israel were killed at the same time (2 Kings 9:24, 27), the same amount of time should have elapsed in both kingdoms, but the count shows 95 years passing in Judah and 98 in Israel. In short, "[t]he data concerning the synchronisms appeared in hopeless contradiction with the data as to the lengths of reigns."

Possibly the most widely followed attempt to reconcile the contradictions has been that proposed by Edwin R. Thiele in his The Mysterious Numbers of the Hebrew Kings (three editions between 1951 and 1983), but his work has been widely criticised for, among other things, introducing "innumerable" co-regencies, constructing a "complex system of calendars", and using "unique" patterns of calculation; as a result his following is largely among scholars "committed ... to a doctrine of scripture's absolute harmony" (the criticism is to be found in Brevard Childs' Introduction to the Old Testament as Scripture). The weaknesses in Thiele's work have led subsequent scholars to continue to propose chronologies, but, in the words of a recent commentary on Kings, there is "little consensus on acceptable methods of dealing with conflicting data."

See also

 Biblical cosmology
 Chronology of the ancient Near East
 Chronology of Babylonia and Assyria
 Dating creation
 Development of the Hebrew Bible canon
 Development of the Old Testament canon
 Development of the New Testament canon
 History of ancient Israel and Judah
 Intertestamental period
 Jewish chronology
 Kings of Judah
 Missing years (Jewish calendar)
 Universal history
 Ussher chronology

References

Sources

 
 
 
 
 
 
 
 
 
 
 
 
 
 
 
 
 
 
 
 
 
 
 
 
 
 
 
 

Bible
Biblical studies
Chronology
Bible
Timelines of Christianity